Hermitage Island is a small island lying south west of Port Sud-Est in Rodrigues, Mauritius.  It is reputed to be the location of buried treasure and is a popular destination for tourists.

References

Geography of Rodrigues